Say No More 3 & 4 is a compilation album by Bob Ostertag, released on April 16, 2002, by Seeland Records. It comprises the 1996 studio album Verbatim and its 1998 live counterpart Verbatim, Flesh and Blood.

Track listing

Personnel
Adapted from the Say No More 3 & 4 liner notes.

Musicians
 Mark Dresser – contrabass
 Gerry Hemingway – percussion
 Phil Minton – voice
 Bob Ostertag – sampler

Release history

References

External links 
 Say No More 3 & 4 at Discogs (list of releases)

2002 compilation albums
Bob Ostertag albums
Seeland Records compilation albums